Stenoglottis is a genus of flowering plants from the orchid family, Orchidaceae native to southern and eastern Africa. Six of the 8 known species are endemic to South Africa.

Stenoglottis fimbriata Lindl. - Swaziland, South Africa
Stenoglottis inandensis G.McDonald & D.G.A.Styles - KwaZulu-Natal
Stenoglottis longifolia Hook.f . - South Africa
Stenoglottis macloughlinii (L.Bolus) G.McDonald ex J.M.H.Shaw  - South Africa
Stenoglottis modestus Truter & Joliffe - KwaZulu-Natal
Stenoglottis molweniensis G.McDonald ex J.M.H.Shaw - KwaZulu-Natal
Stenoglottis woodii Schltr. - KwaZulu-Natal
Stenoglottis zambesiaca Rolfe in D.Oliver & auct. suc. - Tanzania, Malawi, Mozambique, Zimbabwe, northeastern South Africa

See also 
 List of Orchidaceae genera

References

External links 

Orchideae genera
Orchids of Africa
Orchideae